St Kilda, Britain's Loneliest Isle is a short, silent film about St Kilda (an archipelago to the west of Scotland) and the final period of its habitation.

In the 1920s, the steamship company running a service between Glasgow and St Kilda commissioned the 18 minute silent movie, directed by Paul Robello and Bobbie Mann. It was released in 1928 and shows some scenes in the lives of the island's inhabitants.

In May 2010, the film was inscribed in UNESCO's UK Memory of the World Register.

Notes

External links
 

Britain's Loneliest Isle
British short documentary films
Anthropology documentary films
1920s short documentary films
Black-and-white documentary films
Scottish films
1928 films
1928 documentary films
British silent short films
British black-and-white films
1920s British films